Margaret Ann Neale is an American academic. She is the Adams Distinguished Professor of Management, Emerita, at the Stanford Graduate School of Business, and the co-author of five books. She is also the co-director of the Stanford GSB Executive Program for Women Leaders.

Education
Neale holds PhD in Business Administration, University of Texas, 1982, MS in Counseling Psychology, VA Commonwealth University, 1977, MS in Hospital Pharmacy Administration, Medical College of VA, 1974, and BS in Pharmacy, University of Louisiana at Monroe (formerly Northeast LA University), 1972.

Selected publications

Books

Articles, a selection

External links

See also

Katherine W. Phillips
Adam Galinsky
Charles A. O'Reilly III

References

Living people
University of Louisiana at Monroe alumni
Virginia Commonwealth University alumni
McCombs School of Business alumni
Stanford University Graduate School of Business faculty
American women academics
Year of birth missing (living people)
Medical College of Virginia alumni
21st-century American women